Colossus and the Amazon Queen (/ Queen of the Amazons) is a 1960 Italian sword and sandal comedy film directed by Vittorio Sala.

Cast 
Rod Taylor as Pirro
Ed Fury as Glauco
Dorian Gray as Antiope
Daniela Rocca as Melitta
Gianna Maria Canale as La Regina
Alberto Farnese as Losco - Il pirata
Giorgia Moll as Amazone
Folco Lulli
Ignazio Leone as Sopho
Adriana Facchetti as Sacerdota
Paola Falchi as Amazone
Enzo Cerusico as Menandro
Marco Tulli as Eumeo - Oste

Production 
The film stars two American actors in the lead roles, Rod Taylor and bodybuilder Ed Fury. Taylor claims to have rewritten the script extensively.

Release
Colossus and the Amazon Queen was released in Italy on 8 September 1960 with a 98-minute running time. It was released in the United States in 1964 with an 84-minute running time.

References

Bibliography

External links 

1960 films
1960s Italian-language films
1960 adventure films
Peplum films
Films directed by Vittorio Sala
Films set in ancient Greece
Sword and sandal
Sword and sandal films
1960s Italian films